A jigsaw puzzle is a tiling puzzle that requires the assembly of often irregularly shaped interlocking and mosaiced pieces, each of which typically has a portion of a picture. When assembled, the puzzle pieces produce a complete picture.

In the 18th century, jigsaw puzzles were created by painting a picture on a flat, rectangular piece of wood, then cutting it into small pieces. Despite the name, a jigsaw was never used. John Spilsbury, a London cartographer and engraver, is credited with commercialising jigsaw puzzles around 1760. His design took world maps, and cut out the individual nations in order for them to be reassembled by students as a geographical teaching aid. They have since come to be made primarily of interlocking cardboard pieces, incorporating a variety of images & designs.

Typical images on jigsaw puzzles include scenes from nature, buildings, and repetitive designs—castles and mountains are common, as well as other traditional subjects. However, any picture can be used. Artisan puzzle-makers and companies using technologies for one-off and small print-run puzzles utilize a wide range of subject matter, including optical illusions, unusual art, and personal photographs. In addition to traditional flat, two-dimensional puzzles, three-dimensional puzzles have entered large-scale production, including spherical puzzles and architectural recreations.

A range of jigsaw puzzle accessories, including boards, cases, frames, and roll-up mats, have become available to assist jigsaw puzzle enthusiasts. While most assembled puzzles are disassembled for reuse, they can also be attached to a backing with adhesive and displayed as art.

History 

John Spilsbury is believed to have produced the first jigsaw puzzle around 1760, using a marquetry saw.

Early puzzles, known as dissections, were produced by mounting maps on sheets of hardwood and cutting along national boundaries, creating a puzzle useful for teaching geography. Royal governess Lady Charlotte Finch used such "dissected maps" to teach the children of King George III and Queen Charlotte Cardboard jigsaw puzzles appeared in the late 1800s, but were slow to replace wooden ones because manufacturers felt that cardboard puzzles would be perceived as low-quality, and because profit margins on wooden jigsaws were larger.

The name "jigsaw" came to be associated with the puzzle around 1880 when fretsaws became the tool of choice for cutting the shapes. Since fretsaws are distinct from jigsaws, the name appears to be a misnomer.

Jigsaw puzzles soared in popularity during the Great Depression, as they provided a cheap, long-lasting, recyclable form of entertainment. It was around this time that jigsaws evolved to become more complex and appealing to adults. They were also given away in product promotions and used in advertising, with customers completing an image of the promoted product.

Sales of wooden puzzles fell after World War II as improved wages led to price increases, while improvements in manufacturing processes made paperboard jigsaws more attractive.

Demand for jigsaw puzzles saw a surge, comparable to that of the Great Depression, during the COVID-19 pandemic's stay-at-home orders.

Modern construction 

Most modern jigsaw puzzles are made of paperboard as they are easier and cheaper to mass-produce. An enlarged photograph or printed reproduction of a painting or other two-dimensional artwork is glued to cardboard, which is then fed into a press. The press forces a set of hardened steel blades of the desired pattern, called a puzzle die, through the board until fully cut.

The puzzle die is a flat board, often made from plywood, with slots cut or burned in the same shape as the knives that are used. The knives are set into the slots and covered in a compressible material, typically foam rubber, which ejects the cut puzzle pieces.

The cutting process is similar to making shaped cookies with a cookie cutter. However, the forces involved are tremendously greater: A typical 1000-piece puzzle requires upwards of 700 tons of force to push the die through the board.

Beginning in the 1930s, jigsaw puzzles were cut using large hydraulic presses that now cost hundreds of thousands of dollars. The precise cuts gave a snug fit, but the cost limited jigsaw puzzle production to large corporations. Recent roller-press methods achieve the same results at a lower cost.

New technology has also enabled laser-cutting of wooden or acrylic jigsaw puzzles. The advantage is that the puzzle can be custom-cut to any size or shape, with any number or average size of pieces. Many museums have laser-cut acrylic puzzles made of some of their art so visiting children can assemble puzzles of the images on display. Acrylic pieces are very durable, waterproof, and can withstand continued use without the image degrading. Also, because the print and cut patterns are computer-based, missing pieces can easily be remade.

By the early 1960s, Tower Press was the world's largest jigsaw puzzle maker; it was acquired by Waddingtons in 1969. Numerous smaller-scale puzzle makers work in artisanal styles, handcrafting and handcutting their creations.

Variations 

Jigsaw puzzles come in a variety of sizes. Among those marketed to adults, 300-, 500- and 750-piece puzzles are considered "smaller". More sophisticated, but still common, puzzles come in sizes of 1,000, 1,500, 2,000, 3,000, 4,000, 5,000, 6,000, 7,500, 8,000, 9,000, 13,200, 18,000, 24,000, 32,000 and 40,000 pieces.

Jigsaw puzzles geared towards children typically have many fewer pieces and are typically much larger. For very young children, puzzles with as few as 4 to 9 large pieces (so as not to be a choking hazard) are standard. They are usually made of wood or plastic for durability and can be cleaned without damage.

The most common layout for a thousand-piece puzzle is 38 pieces by 27 pieces, for an actual total of 1,026 pieces. Most 500-piece puzzles are 27 pieces by 19 pieces. A few puzzles are double-sided so they can be solved from either side—adding complexity, as the enthusiast must determine if they are looking at the right side of each piece.

"Family puzzles" of 100–550 pieces use an assortment of small, medium and large pieces, with each size going in one direction or towards the middle of the puzzle. This allows a family of different skill levels and hand sizes to work on the puzzle together. Companies like Springbok, Cobble Hill, Ceaco, Buffalo Games and Suns Out make this type of specialty puzzle. Ravensburger, on the other hand, formerly made this type of puzzle from 2000 until 2008.

There are also three-dimensional jigsaw puzzles. Many are made of wood or styrofoam and require the puzzle to be solved in a particular order, as some pieces will not fit if others are already in place. One type of 3-D jigsaw puzzle is a puzzle globe, often made of plastic. Like 2-D puzzles, the assembled pieces form a single layer, but the final form is three-dimensional. Most globe puzzles have designs representing spherical shapes such as the Earth, the Moon, and historical globes of the Earth.

Also common are puzzle boxes, simple three-dimensional puzzles with a small drawer or box in the center for storage.

Jigsaw puzzles can vary significantly in price depending on their complexity, number of pieces, and brand. In the US, children's puzzles can start around $5, while larger ones can be closer to $50. The most expensive puzzle to date was sold for $US27,000 in 2005 at a charity auction for The Golden Retriever Foundation.

Several word-puzzle games use pieces similar to those in jigsaw puzzles. Examples include Alfa-Lek, Jigsaw Words, Nab-It!, Puzzlage, Typ-Dom, Word Jigsaw, and Yottsugo.

Puzzle pieces 

Many puzzles are termed "fully interlocking", which means that adjacent pieces are connected so that they stay attached when one is turned. Sometimes the connection is tight enough to pick up a solved part by holding one piece.

Some fully interlocking puzzles have pieces of a similar shape, with rounded tabs (interjambs) on opposite ends and corresponding indentations—called blanks—on the other two sides to receive the tabs. Other fully interlocking puzzles may have tabs and blanks variously arranged on each piece; but they usually have four sides, and the numbers of tabs and blanks thus add up to four. Uniformly shaped fully interlocking puzzles, sometimes called "Japanese Style", are the most difficult because the differences in the pieces' shapes are most subtle.

Most jigsaw puzzles are square, rectangular or round, with edge pieces with one straight or smoothly curved side, plus four corner pieces (if the puzzle is square or rectangular). However, some puzzles have edge, and corner pieces cut like the rest, with no straight sides, making it more challenging to identify them. Other puzzles utilize more complex edge pieces to form unique shapes when assembled, such as profiles of animals.

The pieces of spherical jigsaw, like immersive panorama jigsaw, can be triangular-shaped, according to the rules of tessellation of the geoid primitive.

Designer Yuu Asaka created "Jigsaw Puzzle 29". Instead of four corner pieces, it has five. The puzzle is made from pale blue acrylic without a picture. It was awarded the Jury Honorable Mention of 2018 Puzzle Design Competition. Because many puzzlers had solved it easily, he created "Jigsaw Puzzle 19" which composed only with corner pieces as revenge. It was made with transparent green acrylic pieces without a picture.

Calculating the number of edge pieces 
Jigsaw puzzlers often want to know in advance how many border pieces they are looking for to verify they have found all of them. Puzzle sizes are typically listed on commercially distributed puzzles but usually include the total number of pieces in the puzzle and do not list the count of edge or interior pieces.

Puzzlers, therefore, calculate the number of border pieces. To calculate B (border pieces) from P (the total piece count), follow this method:
 List the prime factors of P.
 For a 513-piece jigsaw, the prime factorization tree is 3×3×3×19=513
 Take the square root of P and round off.
   22.6
 round to 23
 Look for numbers in the prime factor list within ±20% of the square root of P.
 Calculate 20% of the rounded square root of P.
  × 23 = 4.6
 Develop the range, ±20%, from the rounded square root of P.
 23 ±4.6 = 18.4 to 27.6
 Compare the range with the factor list. Define this as E1.
 The factor list shows 19 in the range.
 Determine the horizontal / vertical dimensions.
 Divide P (the total number of pieces) by E1 to determine the horizontal / vertical dimensions, E1xE2.
 513 / 19 = 27
 This is probably a 19×27 puzzle.
 Alternative method: take the remaining numbers from the prime factorization tree.
 3x3x3 = 27
 Add the four sides and subtract 4 to correct for the corner pieces, which would otherwise be counted in both the horizontal and vertical.
 (27 × 2)+(19 × 2)-4 = 88

These 88 border pieces include 4 corners, 17 pieces between corners on the short sides, and 25 between corners on the long sides.

Common puzzle dimensions:
 1000 piece puzzle: 1026 pieces, 126 border pieces (38x27)

World records

Largest commercially available jigsaw puzzles

Largest-sized jigsaw puzzles 
The world's largest-sized jigsaw puzzle measured  with 21,600 pieces, each measuring a Guinness World Records maximum size of 50 cm by 50 cm. It was assembled on 3 November 2002 by 777 people at the former Kai Tak Airport in Hong Kong.

Largest jigsaw puzzle – most pieces 

The jigsaw with the greatest number of pieces had 551,232 pieces and measured 14.85 × 23.20 m (48 ft 8.64 in × 76 ft 1.38 in). It was assembled on 25 September 2011 at Phú Thọ Indoor Stadium in Ho Chi Minh City, Vietnam, by students of the University of Economics, Ho Chi Minh City. It is listed by the Guinness World Records for the "Largest Jigsaw Puzzle – most pieces", but as the intact jigsaw had been divided into 3,132 sections, each containing 176 pieces, which were reassembled and then connected, the claim is controversial.

Society 
The logo of Wikipedia is a globe made out of jigsaw pieces. The incomplete sphere symbolizes the room to add new knowledge.

In the logo of the Colombian Office of the Attorney General appears a jigsaw puzzle piece in the foreground. They named it "The Key Piece": "The piece of a puzzle is the proper symbol to visually represent the Office of the Attorney General because it includes the concepts of search, solution and answers that the entity pursues through the investigative activity."

Art and entertainment 
The central antagonist in the Saw film franchise is nicknamed Jigsaw, due to his practice of cutting the shape of a puzzle piece from the remains of his victims.

In the 1933 Laurel and Hardy short Me and My Pal, several characters attempt to complete a large jigsaw puzzle.

Lost in Translation is a poem about a child putting together a jigsaw puzzle, as well as an interpretive puzzle itself.

Life: A User's Manual, Georges Perec's most famous novel, tells as pieces of a puzzle a story about a jigsaw puzzle maker.

Jigsaw Puzzle (song), sometimes spelled "Jig-Saw Puzzle" is a song by the rock and roll band The Rolling Stones, featured on their 1968 album Beggars Banquet.

In ‘‘Citizen Kane‘’ Susan Alexander Kane (Dorothy Comingore) is reduced to spending her days completing jigsaws after the failure of her operatic career. After Kane’s death when ‘’Xanadu’’ is emptied, hundreds of jigsaw puzzles are discovered in the cellar.

Rhett And Link Do A Rainy Day Jigsaw Puzzle is a short video by self-described “internetainers” (portmanteau of “Internet” and “entertainers”) Rhett & Link which portrays the frustration of discovering a puzzle piece is missing.

Mental health 
According to the Alzheimer Society of Canada, doing jigsaw puzzles is one of many activities that can help keep the brain active and may reduce the risk of Alzheimer's disease.

Jigsaw puzzle pieces were first used as a symbol for autism in 1963 by the United Kingdom's National Autistic Society. The organization chose jigsaw pieces for their logo to represent the "puzzling" nature of autism and the inability to "fit in" due to social differences, and also because jigsaw pieces were recognizable and otherwise unused. Puzzle pieces have since been incorporated into the logos and promotional materials of many organizations, including the Autism Society of America and Autism Speaks.

Proponents of the autism rights movement oppose the jigsaw puzzle iconography, stating that metaphors such as "puzzling" and "incomplete" are harmful to autistic people. Critics of the puzzle piece symbol instead advocate for a gold-colored or red infinity symbol representing diversity. In 2017, the journal Autism concluded that the use of the jigsaw puzzle evoked negative public perception towards autistic individuals. They removed the puzzle piece from their cover in February 2018.

See also 
 Edge-matching puzzle
 Jigsaw puzzle accessories
 Tessellation
 Wentworth Wooden Puzzles

References

External links 

 Jigsaw-puzzle.org at jigsaw-puzzle.org (November 2000; archived from Wayback Machine)
History of Jigsaw puzzle at puzzlewarehouse.com
Why don't Jigsaw Puzzles have the correct number of pieces? – Matt Parker

 
Tiling puzzles
Mechanical puzzles
Traditional toys
Wooden toys